Julia Dean may refer to:

 Julia Dean (steamboat), the name of two river steamboats on the Mississippi River
 Julia Dean (actress, born 1878) (1878–1952), American stage and film actress
 Julia Dean (actress, born 1830) (1830–1868), American stage actress

Dean, Julia